Temple of Thought is the fifth studio album by the Finnish rock band Poets of the Fall. It was released in Finland on 17 March 2012. A bonus edition has released in Germany on 20 July 2012. The album entered the Finnish charts at no.3.

Track listing

Bonus Edition

Release history

"*"= Bonus Edition

The album has been released on limited edition vinyl of 1000 copies in gatefold cover on 17 July 2015 by soundsUP records. For this release, the audio has been completely remastered from source material and the layout design altered with tarot-card theme. A collector's edition on transparent vinyl (300 copies) has a 3D-Popup of 4 cards in the center and the regular edition (700 copies) has an in insert with the band photo.

Singles

References

2012 albums
Poets of the Fall albums